"Nick of Time" is episode 43 of the American television anthology series The Twilight Zone. It originally aired on November 18, 1960 on CBS.

Opening narration

Plot
When newlyweds Don and Pat Carter's automobile breaks down in Ridgeview, Ohio, en route to New York City, they have lunch at the Busy Bee Cafe while they wait for repairs to be made. The table they sit in has a fortune teller machine on the table that answers yes or no questions for a penny each. Don asks if he is going to get a promotion at work. The card says, "It has been decided in your favor." Don calls the office and learns he has been promoted to office manager. Don then asks if their car will be fixed in the promised time, and receives the answer, "You may never know." Questioning the seer on this point produces eerily relevant answers, leading to the prediction that it is unsafe to leave the diner until 3 p.m.

Don stalls for time, but Pat argues that the seer cannot predict the future and convinces him to leave a few minutes before 3, and the couple is almost struck by a car while crossing the street. They return to the café but find another couple at their table. Don has them wait at the counter until the couple has left. Pat remains skeptical, contending that the seer answers in generalities; she feels that Don is creating the links to his questions himself. They go back to the table, where Don asks different questions, including one about their car. The seer answers, "It has already been taken care of," and the mechanic steps into the diner to say the car is fixed. Don challenges Pat to try it for herself. Although she asks the seer trick questions, the answers are still accurate.

Don wants the seer to tell him where they're going to live, but Pat finally tells Don that whether or not the seer can really tell the future doesn't matter, since he is capable of making his own future. Recognizing the truth in what she says, Don apologizes and then announces to the seer that they are leaving to do what they please. After their exit, a distraught older couple enters the diner, sitting at the seer's table, and the man asks questions about their fate, increasingly deflated by the answers.

Closing narration

Cast
 William Shatner as Don S. Carter
 Patricia Breslin as Pat Carter
 Stafford Repp as Mechanic (Lars)
 Guy Wilkerson as Counter Man
 Walter Reed as Man
 Dee Carroll as Woman

Production notes

Richard Matheson, writing in The Twilight Zone Magazine, said that he wished that Pat Breslin (who played Pat Carter) had been available again to play the wife of Shatner's character in the season five episode "Nightmare at 20,000 Feet".

The street and building seen in this episode are the same as seen in the episode "I Sing the Body Electric". Both episodes feature scenes in which people are almost run over by vehicles on the same street.

The street and building are also visible in the opening scene of the episode "Black Leather Jackets".

When selecting a record in the jukebox to celebrate his promotion, Don chooses the Glenn Miller version of "American Patrol".

Legacy
Replay, an episode of the 2019 revival series, features a shot of the mystic seer in a cafe.

See also
 List of The Twilight Zone (1959 TV series) episodes
 "The Path" – A related episode

References
 Zicree, Marc Scott. The Twilight Zone Companion. Sillman-James Press, 1982 (second edition).
 DeVoe, Bill. (2008). Trivia from The Twilight Zone. Albany, GA: Bear Manor Media. 
 Grams, Martin. (2008). The Twilight Zone: Unlocking the Door to a Television Classic. Churchville, MD: OTR Publishing.

External links
 
 Guide to building your own Mystic Seer
 Computer version of the Mystic Seer

The Twilight Zone (1959 TV series season 2) episodes
1960 American television episodes
Television episodes written by Richard Matheson
Television episodes set in Ohio